Uzbekistan competed at the 2017 Asian Winter Games in Sapporo and Obihiro, Japan from February 19 to 26. The country competed with one athlete in one sport: figure skating. 

Uzbekistan originally did not enter any athletes at the close of entries in December 2016. However, the country was allowed to enter athletes after the deadline.

Competitors
The following table lists the Uzbekistani delegation per sport and gender.

Figure skating

Uzbekistan's lone athlete competed in the men's singles event. Misha Ge, scored 76.18 points in the short program to be ranked eighth.

Individual

See also
Uzbekistan at the 2018 Winter Olympics

References

Nations at the 2017 Asian Winter Games
Uzbekistan at the Asian Winter Games
2017 in Uzbekistani sport